There were two United States Senate special elections in Florida in 1936:

1936 United States Senate special election in Florida (Class 1)
1936 United States Senate special election in Florida (Class 3)